The AFL Record is the official program available at Australian Football League (AFL) matches. The publication began as the Football Record in Melbourne, Australia in 1912, making it one of the oldest magazines in Australia.

The publication is also known affectionately by fans as the Footy Record and many other leagues have since adopted a similar format and produce their own "footy record".
The price of the Grand Final Record and post Grand Final magazine, “AFL Record Premiers”, are both $15 as of 2021.
A book version of the AFL Record, published every year prior to the AFL season, is called the “AFL Record Season Guide”, with the year for the AFL fixtures, e.g. AFL Record Season Guide 2021 which includes fixtures for that particular year.
The price of this publication is $39.95 as of 2021.
This publication includes statistics on all AFL Clubs, South Australian Football League, and West Australian Football League, although the statistics are not as comprehensive as the AFL statistics. The AFL Women’s Football League is included but not the Women’s League from other states.
The book also includes Awards, Records of Goals, and Matches, Hall of Fame, and Legends lists, Umpires, and Grand Final Scores of all states.

The AFL Record, in its current format, is published and produced by AFL Media, the AFL's media platform which produces and provides content for the official AFL website (AFL.com.au) and the AFL App. As of 2018, the editor of the AFL Record is Michael Lovett.

In July, 2018, the AFL sold the AFL Record and its related products to Crocmedia, now known as Sports Entertainment Network, in an $8.1 million deal.

The sports media company will take over all weekly match-day magazine content, including the AFL Record, AFLW publications, the AFL Season Guide and AFL Grand Final edition.

History
The publication began as the Football Record in Melbourne, Australia on 27 April 1912, making it one of the oldest magazines in Australia. It was initially formatted as a pocketbook guide to assist spectators of  matches when the league was known as the VFL.  The guide helped identify players on the field.  As only their numbers were worn on their guernseys, the record contained a list of player names so that spectators could tell who is who.

Over time, the record included a section for keeping track of how many goals and behinds players have kicked while the game is being played and this became a traditional pastime of many footy spectators, something which is fairly unusual to the game.  Special interest articles were also added, as well as scores, reports and updates from other leagues around the country.

The AFL Record was known as the Football Record until 1998, and in 1999 the current title was adopted.

Today's Record
Today's official AFL Record is published in a sports magazine style format. Nine different versions (one for each game) were published for each weekly round (60,000 copies in total) prior to 2022 and Roy Morgan Research estimated in 2014 that the Record has a weekly readership of over 200,000.

To reduce costs, the format for the record changed in the 1990s with the advent of the national league to include an outer magazine which covers regular columns and stories about the entire league and an insert with specifics on the current game such as teamsheets and scoresheets.

With the advent of themed rounds in the AFL, the Record is often themed accordingly, with issues such as "Women's round", for example, containing articles about women's involvement in the game. Many themed rounds are repeated annually, such as the ANZAC Day edition, Hall of Fame, Derby Day, Showdown, Indigenous or "Dreamtime" round, the "Big Freeze", and Maddy's Round. In addition, players who reach a milestone of 250, 300 or 350 AFL games are typically honoured with a front cover and a feature story.

The Grand Final Record is typically more expensive and has significantly more content. It is distributed in newsagents, available the Monday prior to the Grand Final (the "News Stand Edition") as well as at the game (the "Match Day Edition"). These were discontinued after a time.

As of 2009, the week's records are now published and are able to be viewed in an "online magazine" format.

In late March 2020, following the COVID-19 lockdowns and as crowds were no longer permitted to attend AFL matches, Crocmedia began publishing a digital version of the Record. They were also sold in newsagents in Victoria. Links to these digital editions are made available via the Record's social media pages such as Instagram, Facebook and Twitter, and the SEN website.

Beginning in 2022, a single standard version of the AFL Record is published weekly, containing information on all nine games. This replaces the previous format of one unique magazine per game. It is available at Coles, Victorian newsagents, as well as at every AFL game. However, exclusive variant covers are available at some games.

Publication details
 AFL record: official program of the Australian Football League. ISSN 1444-2973. 1999- to current date
 Football record  1912–1998. ISSN 1324-8340  Victorian Football League, -1989; Australian Football League, 1990–1998.
 Vol.1 no.1 (27 Apr. 1912)-v. 87, no.26 (26 Sept. 1998).

References

External links 
 AFL Record online
 Complete online archive of the Football Record and AFL Record at the State Library of Victoria
 The Slattery Media Group
 B&T: AFL Record kicks revenue goal

1912 establishments in Australia
Australian Football League
Sports magazines published in Australia
Magazines established in 1912
Australian rules football culture
Mass media in Melbourne
Weekly magazines published in Australia